The Selah Jubilee Singers were an American gospel vocal quartet, who appeared in public as a gospel group but who also had a successful recording career as a secular group in the 1930s & 1940s.

History

Around 1927, Thermon Ruth (1914–2002) founded the Selah Jubilee Singers, a group drawn from the membership of a church choir, while he was the deejay at WOR in Brooklyn, New York. He later based them in Raleigh, North Carolina when he moved his radio show to station WPTF. The Selah Jubilee Singers first recorded on April 28, 1938 for Decca, a session which included popular songs such as "Take My Hand, Precious Lord" (DE 7598), and in February 1941, "I'll Fly Away" (DE 7831). Their best recording was the first-ever recording of "Just a Closer Walk With Thee," recorded on October 8, 1941, (Decca Records 7872) New York City; with Thermon Ruth and John Ford lead vocal, Fred Baker, lead baritone; Monroe Clark, baritone; J. B. Nelson, bass vocal; and Fred Baker on guitar.

By the late 1940s, the members were Ruth, Alden ("Allen") Bunn, Junius Parker, Melvin Coldten, and Jimmy Gorham.  In 1949, Ruth and Bunn decided to form a secular vocal group, which became The Larks.  The Larks recorded most successfully for Apollo Records, a New York City area record company, but split up in 1952.

The Selah Jubilee Singers became the first gospel group to play in the famed Apollo Theater, known for its vaudeville acts, after Therman Ruth convinced the owner, Frank Shiffman, to allow a gospel act. On December 15, 1955, the Selah Jubilee Singers  debuted at the Apollo, the first gospel group to play at any commercial theater.   Ruth ensured that a variety of music was featured in order to broaden the appeal: gospel, jubilee, and spirituals but with an emphasis on rhythm as well as the emotional components of gospel.

Selective discography

Footnotes

American gospel musical groups
Musical groups established in 1927